Bernadotte Perrin (15 September 1847 – 31 August 1920) was an American classicist.

Life 

He was born in Goshen, Connecticut on September 15, 1847. He was the son of Lavalette Perrin, a Congregational minister, and Ann Eliza Perrin.  He died on August 31, 1920, at Saratoga Springs, New York.

Career 

He was Lampson Professor of Greek Literature and History at Yale University.

He was a member of the Church of Christ in Yale College and held office as president of the Graduates Club of New Haven.

Bibliography 
 Eight Books of Homer's Odyssey (w/ T. Seymour)
 Plutarch's Themistocles and Aristides 
 History 
 Plutarch's Nicias and Alcibiades 
 Greek Dramas by Aeschylus, Sophocles, Euripides, and Aristophanes
 Six of Plutarch's Greek Lives

References

External links
 Wikisource

American classical scholars
1847 births
1920 deaths
People from Goshen, Connecticut
Yale University faculty
Writers from Connecticut